State Trunk Highway 20 (often called Highway 20, STH-20 or WIS 20) is a  state highway in Walworth and Racine counties in southeastern Wisconsin, United States. The route is a short connector that bridges the city of Whitewater and points west via U.S. Highway 12 (US 12) with East Troy, Waterford and Racine. WIS 20 is a two-lane surface road with various four-lane roads within cities.

Route description
WIS 20 connects with Interstate 43 (I-43) in East Troy, then meanders eastward into Racine County WIS 20 provides indirect access to Alpine Valley Music Theater which is south of the village just off WIS 120  WIS 20 merges with WIS 83 east on the west side of Waterford and both highways turn southeast into the village. WIS 83 splits to the south at WIS 20's junction with WIS 36 in Rochester. From here, WIS 20 turns east again, where it becomes Washington Avenue. WIS 20 connects with WIS 75 and crosses US 45 in the town of Yorkville.

WIS 20 has an interchange with I-94 and US 41 in Ives Grove. and enters Mount Pleasant upon crossing the Interstate, following Washington Avenue.  WIS 20 crosses WIS 31 while in Mount Pleasant, then enters converges with WIS 32 just southwest of downtown Racine. The two routes follow Washington Avenue northeast and turn east onto the one-way 7th Street. WIS 20 completes a loop to turn around onto westbound one-way 6th Street as WIS 32 turns north onto Main Street in downtown Racine. These intersections form the eastern terminus of WIS 20.

History
The section between Rochester and Racine existed since the dawn of the Wisconsin highway system in 1917.  WIS 20 was routed southwest along WIS 36 to Burlington, then west from there along present day WIS 11, not including the Janesville or Monroe bypasses. The route also passed through Gratiot, Delavan, and Elkhorn.  The western terminus at the time was at the Illinois border at East Dubuque.  The route was scaled back to end at Rochester in 1934 when US 14 replaced WIS 11's original alignment. This was also done to avoid a possible conflict with U.S. Route 20 running parallel in Illinois. The western segment from La Grange to Rochester was added in 1947.

Major intersections

See also

References

External links

 WIS 20 Terminus Photos at Wisconsin Highway Ends

020
Transportation in Walworth County, Wisconsin
Transportation in Racine County, Wisconsin